Seremban Inner Ring Road (SIRR) or Jalan Lingkaran Dalam Seremban is a multi-lane ring road highway in Seremban, Negeri Sembilan, Malaysia.

The Kilometre Zero of the SIRR is located at Jalan Mantin interchange. It connects to the Kajang–Seremban Highway.

At most sections, the SIRR was built under the JKR R5 road standard, allowing maximum speed limit of up to 90 km/h.

List of interchanges

References 

Ring roads in Malaysia
Highways in Malaysia